The 2007–08 season was ES Sétif's 38th season in the Algerian top flight. They competed in National 1, the Algerian Cup, the Super Cup, the CAF Champions League and the Arab Champions League.

Squad list
Players and squad numbers last updated on 1 September 2007.Note: Flags indicate national team as has been defined under FIFA eligibility rules. Players may hold more than one non-FIFA nationality.

Competitions

Overview

{| class="wikitable" style="text-align: center"
|-
!rowspan=2|Competition
!colspan=8|Record
!rowspan=2|Started round
!rowspan=2|Final position / round
!rowspan=2|First match	
!rowspan=2|Last match
|-
!
!
!
!
!
!
!
!
|-
| National

|  
| 3rd
| 23 August 2007
| 26 May 2008
|-
| Algerian Cup

| colspan=2|Round of 64
| colspan=2|11 January 2008
|-
| Super Cup

| Final
| style="background:silver;"|Runners–up
| colspan=2|1 November 2007
|-
| CAF Champions League

| Preliminary round
| First round
| 15 February 2008
| 6 April 2008
|-
| Arab Champions League

| Round 32
| style="background:gold;"|Winner
| 16 September 2007
| 22 May 2008
|-
! Total

National

League table

Results summary

Results by round

Matches

Algerian Cup

Algerian Super Cup

CAF Champions League

Preliminary round

First round

Arab Champions League

Round of 32

Round of 16

Group stage

Group A

Semi-finals

Final

Squad information

Playing statistics

|-
! colspan=16 style=background:#dcdcdc; text-align:center| Goalkeepers

|-
! colspan=16 style=background:#dcdcdc; text-align:center| Defenders

|-
! colspan=16 style=background:#dcdcdc; text-align:center| Midfielders

|-
! colspan=16 style=background:#dcdcdc; text-align:center| Forwards

|-
! colspan=16 style=background:#dcdcdc; text-align:center| Players transferred out during the season

Goalscorers
Includes all competitive matches. The list is sorted alphabetically by surname when total goals are equal.

Transfers

In

Out

References

ES Sétif seasons
ES Setif